Lake Tragadero (Spanish: "Laguna Tragadero") is a lake in the Junín Region in Peru.

The area has dry winters and warm summers and can be sensitive to seismic activities.

The nearest city is Jauja, the main city of Jauja Province.

See also
List of lakes in Peru

References
INEI, Compendio Estadistica 2007, page 26

Lakes of Peru
Lakes of Junín Region